Willow Creek Dam is a dam in Lewis and Clark County, Montana.

The earthen dam was originally constructed between 1907 and 1911 by the United States Bureau of Reclamation, then modified and reinforced several times since. The dam is owned and operated by the Bureau.

Recreation includes fishing (for rainbow trout and kokanee salmon), camping, hunting, boating, and hiking.

References

Dams in Montana
Reservoirs in Montana
United States Bureau of Reclamation dams
Buildings and structures in Lewis and Clark County, Montana
Dams completed in 1911
Rivers of Lewis and Clark County, Montana
1911 establishments in Montana